Sphingomonas pseudosanguinis  is a bacterium from the genus of Sphingomonas, which has been isolated from a humidifier in Germany.

References

Further reading

External links
Type strain of Sphingomonas pseudosanguinis at BacDive -  the Bacterial Diversity Metadatabase

pseudosanguinis
Bacteria described in 2007